"Can't Buy Me Love" is a song by the Beatles.

Can't Buy Me Love may also refer to:

 Can't Buy Me Love (book), a 2007 biography of the Beatles by Jonathan Gould
 Can't Buy Me Love (film), a 1987 teen comedy starring Patrick Dempsey and Amanda Peterson
 "Can't Buy Me Love" (Frasier), an episode of the television series Frasier
 Can't Buy Me Love (TV series) (Chinese: 公主嫁到), a 2010 TVB comedy television drama

See also
 Can't Buy My Love, an album by Yui